Noahidism or Noachidism is a monotheistic Jewish religious movement based upon the Seven Laws of Noah and their traditional interpretations within Orthodox Judaism. According to the Jewish law, non-Jews (Goyim) are not obligated to convert to Judaism, but they are required to observe the Seven Laws of Noah to be assured of a place in the World to Come, the final reward of the righteous. The penalty for violating any of the Noahide laws is discussed in the Talmud, but in practical terms it is subject to the working legal system which is established by the society at large. The modern Noahide movement was founded in the 1990s by Orthodox rabbis from Israel, mainly tied to Chabad-Lubavitch and religious Zionist organizations, including The Temple Institute.

Historically, the Hebrew term  has been applied to all non-Jews as descendants of Noah. However, nowadays it is primarily used to refer specifically to those "Righteous Gentiles" who observe the Seven Laws of Noah. Noahide communities have spread and developed primarily in the United States, United Kingdom, Latin America, Nigeria, the Philippines, and Russia. , there are over 20,000 official Noahides around the world and the country with the greatest number is the Philippines.

The Noahic Covenant

The theological basis for the seven commandments of the Noahic Covenant is said to be derived interpretatively from demands addressed to Adam and to Noah, who are believed to be the progenitors of humankind in Judaism, and therefore to be regarded as universal. The seven commandments of the Noahic Covenant enumerated in the Babylonian Talmud ( 8:4,  56a-b) are:
 Do not worship idols.
 Do not curse God.
 Do not murder.
 Do not commit adultery or sexual immorality.
 Do not steal.
 Do not eat flesh torn from a living animal.
 Establish courts of justice.

According to the American Roman Catholic priest and dogmatic theologian Bruce R. Barnes, the obligation to follow the Noahic Covenant and its seven commandments was incumbent upon the Jewish people as well, and remained effective for them until the Ten Commandments were given to Moses on Mount Sinai:

Historical precedents

The concept of "Righteous Gentiles" (gerim toshavim) has a few precedents in the history of Judaism, primarily during Biblical times and the Roman domination of the Mediterranean. The  or God-fearers of the Roman Empire were another ancient example of non-Jews being included within the Jewish community without converting to Judaism.

During the Golden Age of Jewish culture in the Iberian Peninsula, the medieval Jewish philosopher and rabbi Moses Maimonides (1135–1204) wrote in the halakhic legal code  that Gentiles (non-Jews) must perform exclusively the Seven Laws of Noah and refrain from studying the Torah or performing any Jewish commandment, including resting on the Shabbat; however, Maimonides also states that if Gentiles want to perform any Jewish commandment besides the Seven Laws of Noah according to the correct halakhic procedure, they are not prevented from doing so. According to Maimonides, teaching non-Jews to follow the Seven Laws of Noah is incumbent on all Jews, a commandment in and of itself. Nevertheless, the majority of rabbinic authorities over the centuries have rejected Maimonides' opinion, and the dominant halakhic consensus has always been that Jews are not required to spread the Noahide laws to non-Jews.

During the 1860s in Western Europe, the idea of Noahidism as a universal Judaic religion for non-Jews was developed by Elijah Benamozegh, an Italian Sephardic Orthodox rabbi and renowned Kabbalist. Between the years 1920s–1930s, French writer  adopted the Noahide laws at the suggestion of his teacher Elijah Benamozegh; afterwards, Pallière spread Benamozegh's doctrine in Europe and never formally converted to Judaism. Modern historians argue that Benamozegh's role in the debate on Jewish universalism in the history of Jewish philosophy was focused on the seven Noahide laws as the means subservient to the shift of Jewish ethics from particularism to universalism, although the arguments that he used to support his universalistic viewpoint were neither original nor unheard in the history of this debate. According to Clémence Boulouque, Carl and Bernice Witten Associate Professor of Jewish and Israel Studies at Columbia University in the City of New York, Benamozegh ignored the ethnocentric biases contained in the Noahide laws, whereas some contemporary right-wing Jewish political movements have embraced them.

Modern Noahide movement

Menachem Mendel Schneerson, the Lubavitcher Rebbe, encouraged his followers on many occasions to preach the Seven Laws of Noah, devoting some of his addresses to the subtleties of this code. Since the 1990s, Orthodox Jewish rabbis from Israel, most notably those affiliated to Chabad-Lubavitch and religious Zionist organizations, including The Temple Institute, have set up a modern Noahide movement. These Noahide organizations, led by religious Zionist and Orthodox Jewish rabbis, are aimed at non-Jews to proselytize among them and commit them to follow the Noahide laws. According to Rachel Z. Feldman, American anthropologist and Assistant Professor of Religious Studies at Dartmouth College, many of the Orthodox Jewish rabbis involved in mentoring Noahides are supporters of the Third Temple movement who believe that the messianic era shall begin with the establishment of a Jewish theocratic state in Israel, supported by communities of Noahides worldwide:

Feldman describes Noahidism as a "new world religion" that "carv[es] out a place for non-Jews in the messianic Zionist project" and "affirms the superiority of Judaism and Jewish biblical right to the Land of Israel, in line with the aims of the growing messianic Third Temple Movement in Jerusalem." She characterizes Noahide ideology in the Philippines and elsewhere in the global south as having a "markedly racial dimension" constructed around "an essential categorical difference between Jews and Noahides". David Novak, professor of Jewish theology and ethics at the University of Toronto, has denounced the modern Noahide movement by stating that "If Jews are telling Gentiles what to do, it's a form of imperialism".

High Council of 

A "High Council of ", set up to represent Noahide communities around the world, was endorsed by a group that claimed to be the new Sanhedrin. The High Council of  consists of a group of Noahides who, at the request of the nascent Sanhedrin, gathered in Jerusalem on 10 January 2006 to be recognized as an international Noahide organization for the purpose of serving as a bridge between the nascent Sanhedrin and Noahides worldwide. There were ten initial members who flew to Israel and pledged to uphold the Seven Laws of Noah and to conduct themselves under the authority of the Noahide  (religious court) of the nascent Sanhedrin.

Acknowledgment
Meir Kahane and Shlomo Carlebach organized one of the first Noahide conferences in the 1980s. In 1990, Kahane was the keynote speaker at the First International Conference of the Descendants of Noah, the first Noahide gathering, in Fort Worth, Texas. After the assassination of Meir Kahane that same year, The Temple Institute, which advocates to rebuild the Third Jewish Temple on the Temple Mount in Jerusalem, started to promote the Noahide laws as well.

The Chabad-Lubavitch movement has been one of the most active in Noahide outreach, believing that there is spiritual and societal value for non-Jews in at least simply acknowledging the Noahide laws. In 1982, Chabad-Lubavitch had a reference to the Noahide laws enshrined in a U.S. Presidential proclamation: the "Proclamation 4921", signed by the then-U.S. President Ronald Reagan. The United States Congress, recalling House Joint Resolution 447 and in celebration of Menachem Mendel Schneerson's 80th birthday, proclaimed 4 April 1982, as a "National Day of Reflection".

In 1989 and 1990, they had another reference to the Noahide laws enshrined in a U.S. Presidential proclamation: the "Proclamation 5956", signed by then-President George H. W. Bush. The United States Congress, recalling House Joint Resolution 173 and in celebration of Menachem Mendel Schneerson's 87th birthday, proclaimed 16 April 1989, and 6 April 1990, as "Education Day, U.S.A."

In January 2004, the spiritual leader of the Druze community in Israel, Sheikh Mowafak Tarif, met with a representative of Chabad-Lubavitch to sign a declaration calling on all non-Jews in Israel to observe the Noahide laws; the mayor of the Arab city of Shefa-'Amr (Shfaram) also signed the document.

In March 2016, the Sephardic Chief Rabbi of Israel, Yitzhak Yosef, declared during a sermon that Jewish law requires that the only non-Jews allowed to live in Israel are obligated to follow the Noahide laws:

Yosef further added:

Yosef's sermon sparked outrage in Israel and was fiercely criticized by several human rights associations, NGOs and members of the Knesset; Jonathan Greenblatt, Anti-Defamation League's CEO and national director, and Carole Nuriel, Anti-Defamation League's Israel Office acting director, issued a strong denunciation of Yosef's sermon:

See also

 Ethical monotheism
 Haredi Judaism
 Hasidic Judaism
 Judaizers
 Modern Orthodox Judaism
 Proselyte
 Righteous among the Nations
 Shituf
 Sons of Noah
 Subbotniks
 Ebionites
 Nazarene (sect)
 Quartodeciman
 Vendyl Jones

References

Further reading

External links

Chabad-Lubavitch (Hasidic dynasty)
Jewish religious movements
New religious movements
 
Orthodox Judaism
Religious Zionism

he:חסיד אומות העולם (הלכה)